Markus Löw (born 4 April 1961) is a former footballer who played as a midfielder or defender. He is the brother of Joachim Löw.

References

External links
 
 Player statistics at statistik-klein.de from the saisons 1982/83, 1983/84, 1984/85, 1985/86, 1986/87, 1987/88, 1988/89, 1989/90 and 1992/93 

1961 births
Living people
People from Schönau im Schwarzwald
Sportspeople from Freiburg (region)
German footballers
Footballers from Baden-Württemberg
Association football midfielders
Association football defenders
SC Freiburg players
FV Biberach players
2. Bundesliga players